Cardinal Sin is a sculpture by graffiti artist Banksy. It is a bust of a cardinal with his face sawn off and replaced with blank tiles. The work was unveiled at the Walker Art Gallery in 2011.

References

2011 establishments in England
2011 sculptures
Works by Banksy